A Lawyer Walks Into a Bar... is a 2007 independent film about lawyers, law school, the California Bar exam, and the obsession America has with its legal system. The film has garnered many positive reviews including coverage from The Wall Street Journal, The Dallas Morning News, Premiere.com and on nationally syndicated television show At the Movies with Ebert & Roeper.

Film content 

This film highlights the trials and tribulations of trying to pass the State Bar of California exam and follows six wanna-be lawyers struggling to prepare and actually pass the test with the lowest national pass rate. One of the test takers in the documentary is Donald Baumeister, an ex-Marine, who had failed the California bar 41 times and is shown in the movie gearing up for attempt #42. A working father, Baumeister never had the time to properly study for the exam.

This movie portrays a common perception of American life – that, in the time of trouble, whether it be civil or criminal, Americans depend on lawyers to navigate the tough waters of today’s judicial system.

Festival accolades

A Lawyer Walks Into a Bar... has won awards at many independent film festivals including the Grand Jury Prize at AFI Dallas's Texas Competition, and Boulder Colorado's Toofy Fest's Best Narrative Feature.

A focus on minorities

A Lawyer Walks Into a Bar... is a movie that not only portrays the fight of the average law school student, but also of the minority and not so fortunate law student trying to pass and be admitted to a major state bar.  The movie follows Magda Madrigal as she attends Peoples College of Law so that she can take the bar and be an advocate for people in her local Hispanic community.

Cast of characters
Megan Meadows and Cassandra Hooks are shown passing the July 2006 Bar examination in the movie. Unfortunately for the rest of those followed for the July 2006 Bar Exam, Donald Baumeister failed the bar for the 42nd time and Sam Garrett failed it for the third time. Magda Madrigal did not take the July 2006 exam because the State Bar determined that she had not taken enough units at Peoples College of Law, an unaccredited law school.

The movie does follow-up with the subsequent exam and shares that Tricia Zunker successfully passed the February 2007 California Bar, but neither Donald Baumeister, Sam Garrett nor Magda Madrigal passed at that time.

While not shown in the movie, the California Bar shows that Ms. Madrigal did pass the July 2009 Bar Exam. Sam Garrett passed the New Jersey Bar Exam in May 2009 and the California Bar Exam in February 2011. He was admitted to the California Bar on October 27, 2011.

Where are they now?
Mr. Baumeister is an Educational Consultant at Integrative Medical Institute of Orange County as well as an instructor at California State University, Los Angeles and Chapman University.

Mr. Garrett was vice-president of Bienvenidos Immigration Services in Los Angeles. He is now in solo practice in New York.

Ms. Hooks is a senior associate at the law firm of Alston & Bird in Los Angeles.

Ms. Madrigal is the managing attorney at Los Angeles offices of BASTA, Inc.

Ms. Meadows currently works at the PR firm of Gallagher & Gallagher in Los Angeles.

Ms. Zunker is in solo practice with the Zunker Law Group in Santa Monica.

References

External links
 
 

American independent films
2007 films
Documentary films about law in the United States
Legal ethics
American documentary films
2007 documentary films
2007 independent films
2000s English-language films
2000s American films